Lieuwe Albertsma (born 1987 in Weesp, Netherlands), known by his stage name Wulf, is a Dutch musician.

Career
In 2012 he participated in The Voice of Holland, failing to get past the auditions stage.

Wulf performed as an interval act at the Eurovision Song Contest 2021 final in Rotterdam alongside Afrojack and Glennis Grace with a pre-recorded version of Afrojack's "Ten Feet Tall" on the Erasmus Bridge.

Discography

Singles

As lead artist

As featured artist

References

1987 births
Living people
People from Weesp
Singing talent show contestants
21st-century Dutch male singers
21st-century Dutch singers